Tuomas Kyrö (born June 4, 1974, in Helsinki) is a Finnish author and cartoonist. He has written novels, columns, causeries and plays and drawn comics and cartoons.

Kyrö has received a prize from the Kalevi Jäntti Foundation in 2005 and the Young Aleksis Prize in 2006. His novel Liitto was a candidate for the Finlandia Prize in literature in 2005. The Finnish Sports Museum Foundation chose the book Urheilukirja (‘Sports Book’) as the Sports Book of the Year in 2011.

Kyrö's book Mielensäpahoittaja (‘The Man Who Gets Upset About Things’) appeared in 2010, and it was based on the radio drama series with the same title, broadcast by YLE in Radio Suomi, in which Antti Litja played the key character.

Tuomas Kyrö was the first person to be granted residence in the Eeva Joenpelto authors’ home in 2005–2009. He lives in Janakkala, Finland, together with his family.

Works

Novels 
 Nahkatakki (‘Leather Jacket’). WSOY, Helsinki, 2001. 
 Tilkka. WSOY, Helsinki, 2003. 
 Liitto (‘Union’). WSOY, Helsinki, 2005. 
 Benjamin Kivi (‘Benjamin's Stone’). WSOY, Helsinki, 2007. 
 700 grammaa (‘700 Grams’). WSOY, Helsinki, 2009. 
 Mielensäpahoittaja. WSOY, Helsinki, 2010. 
 Kerjäläinen ja jänis (‘The Beggar and the Hare’). Siltala, Helsinki, 2011. 
 Kyrö, Tuomas & Kyrö, Antti: Pukin paha päivä (‘A Bad Day for Santa’). WSOY, Helsinki, 2011. 
 Miniä (‘Daughter-in-Law’). Kirjakauppaliitto, Helsinki, 2012. 
 Mielensäpahoittaja ja ruskeakastike. WSOY, Helsinki, 2012. 
 Kyrö, Tuomas & Kyrö, Antti: Pukki laivalla. WSOY, Helsinki, 2012. 
 Kunkku ('The King'). Siltala, Helsinki, 2013. .
 Ilosia aikoja, mielensäpahoittaja. WSOY, Helsinki, 2014. .

Other Works 
 Taide ja tolkku (‘Art and Reason’). WSOY, Helsinki, 2008. 
 Urheilukirja (‘A Sports Book’). Helsinki, Teos, 2011.

Sources 
 WSOY’s authors
 Authors on Vantaa City Library’s website

References

External links 
 Tuomas Kyrö in Kirjasampo.fi:ssä (in Finnish)
 Tuomas Kyrö reads the Mielensäpahoittaja novellas, videos on the Kirjastokaista website, (in Finnish)
 Interview with Tuomas Kyrö in the Image magazine, (in Finnish)

Finnish writers
1974 births
Living people